Beaver River was a provincial electoral district in Alberta mandated to return a single member to the Legislative Assembly of Alberta from 1913 to 1952.  It was created in 1913 from the western half of Pakan, and abolished in 1952 when it and the northern parts of Athabasca were replaced by Lac La Biche.

Representation history

Beaver River's first MLA was Liberal Wilfrid Gariépy, a Quebec-born settler whose residency would be the subject of controversy toward the end of his second term. He did not run for a third, choosing instead to return to Trois-Rivières. Liberal Joseph Dechêne won the riding in 1921, but would go on to defeat in 1926. He later became MLA for neighbouring St. Paul.

John Delisle picked Beaver River up for the United Farmers of Alberta, serving only one term. In the 1930 election, a judicial recount declared him narrowly defeated by Liberal Henry Dakin, who would also serve only one term.

In the 1935 Social Credit sweep, Lucien Maynard won Beaver River by a landslide. He easily won re-election twice more, retiring for the 1948 election.

Social Credit kept the riding, with Harry Lobay narrowly beating his Liberal challenger and serving out the riding's last term. It was replaced in 1952, but Lobay would go on to serve another term as MLA for the new riding of Lac La Biche.

Election results

1910s

1920s

1930s

1940s

Overall swing is based on first count. Second-round swing reflects increase in vote share from the first count.

See also
List of Alberta provincial electoral districts
Beaver River, a large river in east-central Alberta and central Saskatchewan, Canada
Beaver River, Alberta, an unincorporated area in central Alberta, Canada, within the Municipal District of Bonnyville No. 87

References

Further reading

External links
Elections Alberta
The Legislative Assembly of Alberta

Former provincial electoral districts of Alberta